Ectoedemia spinosella is a moth of the family Nepticulidae. It is found in southern Europe, reaching in the north to the southern part of Great Britain, the Netherlands, central Germany and Poland. It has also been recorded from the Crimea, the Caucasus and the European part of the former Soviet Union. It is common in western Turkmenistan.

The wingspan is 3.2-4.9 mm for males and 3.4–5 mm for females. Adults are on wing in August and October.

The larvae feed on Prunus cerasifera, Prunus domestica, Prunus dulcis, Prunus fruticosa, Prunus spinosa and Prunus webbii. They mine the leaves of their host plant. The mine consists of a narrow, contorted gallery, almost completely filled with reddish frass, later becoming less contorted with the frass leaving clear margins. Finally the corridor widens into a rather small elongate blotch.

External links
Bladmineerders.nl
Nepticulidae from the Volga and Ural region

Nepticulidae
Moths of Europe
Moths of Asia
Moths described in 1908